Flag crater is a small crater in the Descartes Highlands of the Moon visited by the astronauts of Apollo 16.  The name of the crater was formally adopted by the IAU in 1973.  Geology Station 1 is adjacent to Flag, at the much smaller Plum crater.

On April 21, 1972, the Apollo 16 Apollo Lunar Module (LM) Orion landed about 1.5 km east of Flag, which is between the prominent North Ray and South Ray craters.  The astronauts John Young and Charles Duke explored the area over the course of three EVAs using a Lunar Roving Vehicle, or rover.  They drove to Flag on EVA 1.

Flag crater is approximately 240 m in diameter and over 20 m deep.  The adjacent crater Plum is only about 30 m in diameter.  The slightly larger crater Spook, also visited by the astronauts, lies less than 1 km to the east.

Flag cuts into the Cayley Formation of Imbrian age.

Samples

The following samples were collected from the vicinity of Plum and Flag crater (Station 1), as listed in Table 6-II of the Apollo 16 Preliminary Science Report, which does not include samples smaller than 25 g weight (of which there were many).  Sample type, lithology, and descriptions are from the Lunar Sample Atlas of the Lunar and Planetary Institute.

External links 
 Apollo 16 Traverses, 78D2S2(25), Lunar and Planetary Institute

References

Apollo 16
Impact craters on the Moon